The Nukumanu Islands, formerly the Tasman Islands, is an atoll of Papua New Guinea, located in the south-western Pacific Ocean, 4 degrees south of the Equator.

Description
The main inhabited islands of Nukumanu are located on the eastern end of the atoll.

The nearest land is Ontong Java Atoll, located only  to the south of Nukumanu. The border between Papua New Guinea and the Solomon Islands runs between these neighboring atolls, which form a small geographic group together with the wholly submerged Roncador Reef at the southern end.

History
In Polynesian history, the main cultural and commercial exchanges took place with the inhabitants of neighboring Ontong Java Atoll, with whom Nukumanu people share many cultural affinities.

Towards the end of the 19th century Nukumanu became part of the German colonial empire. It was captured by Australia in 1914 and formally transferred to Australian administration as a League of Nations mandate in 1920 by the Treaty of Versailles, after Germany's defeat in World War I.

Nukumanu's most recent claim to fame is that it was the last place on the path of Amelia Earhart before she and her co-pilot Fred Noonan disappeared forever into the vast Pacific Ocean. Their last known position report was near the Nukumanu Islands, about 800 miles (1,300 km) into the flight.

The land resources of the Nukumanu people are quite few and they grow a kind of taro and bananas. Coconuts are an integral part of the islanders' diet with the soft inside being a staple food and coconut flesh being consumed with raw fish and clams. They are also competent fishermen, who dive for bêche-de-mer in the lagoon. This is exported mainly to Asia, and along with trochus shells, used to make mother-of-pearl, they comprise the backbone of the Nukumanu economy.

Anthropological studies
This atoll has a Polynesian population whose ancestors migrated westwards out of Polynesia. Their language is classified in the Samoic–Outlier branch of Polynesian. The Nukumanu Islands, together with neighboring Ontong Java retain a Polynesian character despite their location in the Melanesian Archipelago of Papua New Guinea and the Solomon Islands respectively.

The first serious research on Nukumanu's inhabitants was conducted by German ethnographers Ernst Sarfert and Hans Damm, during a German scientific expedition of the Southern Seas that took place in 1908–1910. This expedition visited both Nukumanu and neighboring Ontong Java Atoll, where they also carried out their research. Their work, "Luangiua und Nukumanu" was published in 1931.

References

Bibliography
 Sarfert, Ernst, and Hans Damm. Luangiua und Nukumanu. Ergebnisse der Südsee Expedition, 1908–1910. Hamburg 1931, 2 vols.

External links 
 

Atolls of Papua New Guinea
Polynesian outliers